Brez (or ) was a  (municipality) in Trentino in the northern Italian region Trentino-Alto Adige/Südtirol, located about  north of Trento.

Geography

Brez borders the following municipalities: Castelfondo, Cloz, Dambel, Fondo, Sarnonico, and Laurein.

Demographic evolution

References

External links
 Homepage of the city

Cities and towns in Trentino-Alto Adige/Südtirol
Nonsberg Group